The economy of Greece is the 53rd largest in the world, with a nominal gross domestic product (GDP) of $222.008 billion per annum. In terms of purchasing power parity, Greece is the world's 54th largest economy, at $387.801 billion per annum. As of 2021, Greece is the sixteenth-largest economy in the European Union. According to the International Monetary Fund's figures for 2022, Greece's GDP per capita is $20,876 at nominal value and $36,466 at purchasing power parity.

Greece is a developed country with an economy based on the service (80%) and industrial sectors (16%), with the agricultural sector contributing an estimated 4% of national economic output in 2017. Important Greek industries include tourism and shipping. With 18 million international tourists in 2013, Greece was the 7th most visited country in the European Union and 16th in the world. The Greek Merchant Navy is the largest in the world, with Greek-owned vessels accounting for 15% of global deadweight tonnage as of 2013. The increased demand for international maritime transportation between Greece and Asia has resulted in unprecedented investment in the shipping industry.

The country is a significant agricultural producer within the EU. Greece has the largest economy in the Balkans and is an important regional investor. Greece was the largest foreign investor in Albania in 2013, the third in Bulgaria, in the top-three in Romania and Serbia and the most important trading partner and largest foreign investor in North Macedonia. The Greek telecommunications company OTE has become a strong investor in certain former Yugoslav and other Balkan countries.

Greece is classified as an advanced, high-income economy, and was a founding member of the Organisation for Economic Co-operation and Development (OECD) and of the Organization of the Black Sea Economic Cooperation (BSEC). The country joined what is now the European Union in 1981. In 2001 Greece adopted the euro as its currency, replacing the Greek drachma at an exchange rate of 340.75 drachmae per euro. Greece is a member of the International Monetary Fund and of the World Trade Organization, and ranked 34th on Ernst & Young's Globalization Index 2011.

World War II (1939–1945) devastated the country's economy, but the high levels of economic growth that followed from 1950 to 1980 have been called the Greek economic miracle. From 2000 Greece saw high levels of GDP growth above the Eurozone average, peaking at 5.8% in 2003 and 5.7% in 2006. The subsequent Great Recession and Greek government-debt crisis, a central focus of the wider European debt crisis, plunged the economy into a sharp downturn, with real GDP growth rates of −0.3% in 2008, −4.3% in 2009, −5.5% in 2010, −10.1% in 2011, −7.1% in 2012 and −2.5% in 2013. In 2011, the country's public debt reached €356 billion (172% of nominal GDP). After negotiating the biggest debt restructuring in history with the private sector, a loss of 100 billions for bonds private investors, Greece reduced its sovereign debt burden to €280 billion (137% of GDP) in the first quarter of 2012. Greece achieved a real GDP growth rate of 0.5% in 2014—after 6 years of economic decline—but contracted by 0.2% in 2015 and by 0.5% in 2016. The country returned to modest growth rates of 1.1% in 2017, 1.7% in 2018 and 1.8% in 2019. GDP contracted by 9% in 2020 during the global recession caused by the COVID-19 pandemic. However, the economy rebounded by 8.3% in 2021. On 20 August 2022, Greece formally exited the EU's "enhanced surveillance framework", which had been in place since the conclusion of the third bailout package exactly four years earlier. According to Prime Minister Kyriakos Mitsotakis, the event heralded "greater national leeway in our economic choices" and marked the end of a "12-year cycle that brought pain to citizens".

History 

The evolution of the Greek economy during the 19th century (a period that transformed a large part of the world because of the Industrial Revolution) has been little researched. Recent research from 2006 examines the gradual development of industry and further development of shipping in a predominantly agricultural economy, calculating an average rate of per capita GDP growth between 1833 and 1911 that was only slightly lower than that of the other Western European nations. Industrial activity, (including heavy industry like shipbuilding) was evident, mainly in Ermoupolis and Piraeus. Nonetheless, Greece faced economic hardships and defaulted on its external loans in 1826, 1843, 1860 and 1893.

Other studies support the above view on the general trends in the economy, providing comparative measures of standard of living. The per capita income (in purchasing power terms) of Greece was 65% that of France in 1850, 56% in 1890, 62% in 1938, 75% in 1980, 90% in 2007, 96.4% in 2008 and 97.9% in 2009.

The country's post-World War II development has largely been connected with the Greek economic miracle. During that period, Greece saw growth rates second only to those of Japan, while ranking first in Europe in terms of GDP growth. It is indicative that between 1960 and 1973 the Greek economy grew by an average of 7.7%, in contrast to 4.7% for the EU15 and 4.9% for the OECD. Also during that period, exports grew by an average annual rate of 12.6%.

Strengths and weaknesses 
Greece enjoys a high standard of living and very high Human Development Index, being ranked 32nd in the world in 2019. However, the severe recession of recent years saw GDP per capita fall from 94% of the EU average in 2009 to 67% between 2017 and 2019. During the same period, Actual Individual Consumption (AIC) per capita fell from 104% to 78% of the EU average.

Greece's main industries are tourism, shipping, industrial products, food and tobacco processing, textiles, chemicals, metal products, mining and petroleum. Greece's GDP growth has also, as an average, since the early 1990s been higher than the EU average. However, the Greek economy continues to face significant problems, including high unemployment levels, an inefficient public sector bureaucracy, tax evasion, corruption and low global competitiveness.

Greece is ranked 58th in the world, and 23rd among EU member states, on the Corruption Perceptions Index. This represents a steady improvement over recent years (roughly returning to its pre-crisis ranking ), especially as compared to its worst performance, which occurred during the culmination of the Debt Crisis, in 2012: in that particular year it had dropped to 94th in the world and last in the EU. However, Greece still has the EU's lowest Index of Economic Freedom and second lowest Global Competitiveness Index, ranking 77th and 59th in the world respectively.

After fourteen consecutive years of economic growth, Greece went into recession in 2008. By the end of 2009, the Greek economy faced the highest budget deficit and government debt-to-GDP ratio in the EU. After several upward revisions, the 2009 budget deficit is now estimated at 15.7% of GDP. This, combined with rapidly rising debt levels (127.9% of GDP in 2009) led to a precipitous increase in borrowing costs, effectively shutting Greece out of the global financial markets and resulting in a severe economic crisis.

Greece was accused of trying to cover up the extent of its massive budget deficit in the wake of the global financial crisis. The allegation was prompted by the massive revision of the 2009 budget deficit forecast by the new PASOK government elected in October 2009, from "6–8%" (estimated by the previous New Democracy government) to 12.7% (later revised to 15.7%). However, the accuracy of the revised figures has also been questioned, and in February 2012 the Hellenic Parliament voted in favor of an official investigation following accusations by a former member of the Hellenic Statistical Authority that the deficit had been artificially inflated in order to justify harsher austerity measures.

The Greek labor force, which amount around  workers, average 2,032 hours of work per worker annually in 2011, is ranked fourth among OECD countries, after Mexico, South Korea and Chile. The Groningen Growth & Development Centre has published a poll revealing that between 1995 and 2005, Greece was the country whose workers have the most hours/year work among European nations; Greeks worked an average of 1,900 hours per year, followed by Spaniards (average of 1,800 hours/year).

As a result of the ongoing economic crisis, industrial production in the country went down by 8% between March 2010 and March 2011, The volume of building activity saw a reduction of 73% in 2010. Additionally, the turnover in retail sales saw a decline of 9% between February 2010 and February 2011.

Between 2008 and 2013 unemployment skyrocketed, from a generational low of 7.2% in the second and third quarters of 2008 to a high of 27.9% in June 2013, leaving over a million jobless. Youth unemployment peaked at 64.9% in May 2013. Unemployment figures have steadily improved in recent years, with the overall rate falling to 10.8% in January 2023 and youth unemployment dropping to 27.9% in October 2022.

Eurozone entry

Greece was accepted into the Economic and Monetary Union of the European Union by the European Council on 19 June 2000, based on a number of criteria (inflation rate, budget deficit, public debt, long-term interest rates, exchange rate) using 1999 as the reference year. After an audit commissioned by the incoming New Democracy government in 2004, Eurostat revealed that the statistics for the budget deficit had been under-reported. However, even after all corrections that followed, the reference year budget deficit did not exceed the allowable upper limit (3%) according to the Eurostat accounting method in force at the time of application, and thus Greece had still met all critiera for Eurozone entry (details given below).

Most of the differences in the revised budget deficit numbers were due to a temporary change of accounting practices by the new government, i.e., recording expenses when military material was ordered rather than received. However, it was the retroactive application of ESA95 methodology (applied since 2000) by Eurostat, that finally raised the reference year (1999) budget deficit to 3.38% of GDP, thus exceeding the 3% limit. This led to claims that Greece (similar claims have been made about other European countries like Italy)
had not actually met all five accession criteria, and the common perception that Greece entered the Eurozone through "falsified" deficit numbers.

In the 2005 OECD report for Greece, it was clearly stated that "the impact of new accounting rules on the fiscal figures for the years 1997 to 1999 ranged from 0.7 to 1 percentage point of GDP; this retroactive change of methodology was responsible for the revised deficit exceeding 3% in 1999, the year of [Greece's] EMU membership qualification". The above led the Greek minister of finance to clarify that the 1999 budget deficit was below the prescribed 3% limit when calculated with the ESA79 methodology in force at the time of Greece's application, and thus the criteria had been met.

The original accounting practice for military expenses was later restored in line with Eurostat recommendations, theoretically lowering even the ESA95-calculated 1999 Greek budget deficit to below 3% (an official Eurostat calculation is still pending for 1999).

An error sometimes made is the confusion of discussion regarding Greece's Eurozone entry with the controversy regarding usage of derivatives' deals with U.S. Banks by Greece and other Eurozone countries to artificially reduce their reported budget deficits. A currency swap arranged with Goldman Sachs allowed Greece to "hide" 2.8 billion Euros of debt, however, this affected deficit values after 2001 (when Greece had already been admitted into the Eurozone) and is not related to Greece's Eurozone entry.

A study of the period 1999–2009 by forensic accountants has found that data submitted to Eurostat by Greece, among other countries, had a statistical distribution indicative of manipulation; "Greece with a mean value of 17.74, shows the largest deviation from Benford's law among the members of the eurozone, followed by Belgium with a value of 17.21 and Austria with a value of 15.25".

2010–2018 government debt crisis

Historical Debt 

Greece, like other European nations, had faced debt crises in the 19th century, as well as a similar crisis in 1932 during the Great Depression. In general, however, during the 20th century it enjoyed one of the highest GDP growth rates on the planet
 (for a quarter century from the early 1950s to mid 1970s, second in the world after Japan). Average Greek government debt-to-GDP for the entire century before the crisis (1909-2008) was lower than that for the UK, Canada, or France, while for the 30-year period (1952-1981) until entrance into the European Economic Community, the Greek government debt-to-GDP ratio averaged only 19.8%.

Between 1981 and 1993 Greece's government debt-to-GDP ratio steadily rose, surpassing the average of what is today the Eurozone in the mid-1980s (see chart right).
For the next 15 years, from 1993 to 2007 (i.e., before the Financial crisis of 2007–2008), Greece's government debt-to-GDP ratio remained roughly unchanged (the value was not affected by the 2004 Athens Olympics), averaging 102% - a value lower than that for Italy (107%) and Belgium (110%) during the same 15-year period, and comparable to that for the U.S. or the OECD average in 2017.

During the latter period, the country's annual budget deficit usually exceeded 3% of GDP, but its effect on the debt-to-GDP ratio was counterbalanced by high GDP growth rates. The debt-to-GDP values for 2006 and 2007 (about 105%) were established after audits resulted in corrections according to Eurostat methodology, of up to 10 percentage points for the particular years (as well as similar corrections for the years 2008 and 2009). These corrections, although altering the debt level by a maximum of about 10%, resulted in a popular notion that "Greece was previously hiding its debt".

Evolution of the debt crisis 

The Greek crisis was triggered by the turmoil of the Great Recession, which led the budget deficits of several Western nations to reach or exceed 10% of GDP. In Greece's case, the high budget deficit (which, after several corrections, was revealed that it had been allowed to reach 10.2%  and 15.1% of GDP in 2008 and 2009, respectively) was coupled with a high public debt to GDP ratio (which, until then, was relatively stable for several years, at just above 100% of GDP - as calculated after all corrections). Thus, the country appeared to lose control of its public debt to GDP ratio, which already reached 127% of GDP in 2009. In addition, being a member of the Eurozone, the country had essentially no autonomous monetary policy flexibility. 
Finally, there was an effect of controversies about Greek statistics (due the aforementioned drastic budget deficit revisions which lead to an increase in the calculated value of the Greek public debt by about 10%, i.e., a public debt to GDP of about 100% until 2007), while there have been arguments about a possible effect of media reports. Consequently, Greece was "punished" by the markets which increased borrowing rates, making impossible for the country to finance its debt since early 2010.

Thus, the Greek economy faced its most-severe crisis since the restoration of democracy in 1974 as the Greek government revised its deficit forecasts from 3.7% in early 2009 and 6% in September 2009, to 12.7% of gross domestic product (GDP) in October 2009.

The aforementioned budget deficit and debt revisions were connected with findings that, through the assistance of Goldman Sachs, JPMorgan Chase and numerous other banks, financial products were developed which enabled the governments of Greece, Italy and many other European countries to hide parts of their borrowing. Dozens of similar agreements were concluded across Europe whereby banks supplied cash in advance in exchange for future payments by the governments involved; in turn, the liabilities of the involved countries were "kept off the books".

According to Der Spiegel, credits given to European governments were disguised as "swaps" and consequently did not get registered as debt because Eurostat at the time ignored statistics involving financial derivatives. A German derivatives dealer had commented to Der Spiegel that "The Maastricht rules can be circumvented quite legally through swaps," and "In previous years, Italy used a similar trick to mask its true debt with the help of a different US bank." These conditions had enabled Greek as well as many other European governments to spend beyond their means, while meeting the deficit targets of the European Union and the monetary union guidelines. In May 2010, the Greek government deficit was again revised and estimated to be 13.6% which was among the highest relative to GDP, with Iceland in first place at 15.7% and the United Kingdom third with 12.6%. Public debt was forecast, according to some estimates, to hit 120% of GDP during 2010.

As a consequence, there was a crisis in international confidence in Greece's ability to repay its sovereign debt, as reflected by the rise of the country's borrowing rates (although their slow rise – the 10-year government bond yield only exceeded 7% in April 2010 – coinciding with a large number of negative articles, has led to arguments about the role of international news media in the evolution of the crisis). In order to avert a default (as high borrowing rates effectively prohibited access to the markets), in May 2010 the other Eurozone countries, and the IMF, agreed to a "rescue package" which involved giving Greece an immediate € in bail-out loans, with more funds to follow, totaling €. In order to secure the funding, Greece was required to adopt harsh austerity measures to bring its deficit under control. Their implementation was to be monitored and evaluated by the European Commission, the European Central Bank and the IMF.

The financial crisis – particularly the austerity package put forth by the EU and the IMF – has been met with anger by the Greek public, leading to riots and social unrest, while there have been theories about the effect of international media. Despite - others say because of - the long range of austerity measures, the government deficit has not been reduced accordingly, mainly, according to many economists, because of the subsequent recession.

Public sector workers have come out on strike in order to resist job cuts and reductions to salaries as the government promises that a large scale privatisation programme will be accelerated. Immigrants are sometimes treated as scapegoats for economic problems by far-right extremists.

In 2013, Greece became the first developed market to be reclassified as an emerging market by different financial rating companies.

By July 2014 there were still anger and protests about the austerity measures, with a 24-hour strike among government workers timed to coincide with an audit by inspectors from the International Monetary Fund, the European Union and European Central Bank in advance of a decision on a second bailout of one billion euros ($1.36 billion), due in late July.

Greece exited its six-year recession in the second quarter of 2014, but the challenges of securing political stability and debt sustainability remain.

A third bailout was agreed in July 2015, after a confrontation with the newly elected leftist government of Alexis Tsipras. In June 2017, news reports indicated that the "crushing debt burden" had not been alleviated and that Greece was at the risk of defaulting on some payments. The International Monetary Fund stated that the country should be able to borrow again "in due course". At the time, the Euro zone gave Greece another credit of $9.5-billion, $8.5 billion of loans and brief details of a possible debt relief with the assistance of the IMF. On 13 July, the Greek government sent a letter of intent to the IMF with 21 commitments it promised to meet by June 2018. They included changes in labour laws, a plan to cap public sector work contracts, to transform temporary contracts into permanent agreements and to recalculate pension payments to reduce spending on social security.

Greece's bailouts successfully ended (as declared) on 20 August 2018.

Effects of the bailout programmes on the debt crisis 
There was a 25% drop in Greece's GDP, connected with the bailout programmes. This had a critical effect: the Debt-to-GDP ratio, the key factor defining the severity of the crisis, would jump from its 2009 level of 127% to about 170%, solely due to the GDP drop (i.e., for the same Debt). Such a level is considered unsustainable.
In a 2013 report, the IMF admitted that it had underestimated the effects of so extensive tax hikes and budget cuts on the country's GDP and issued an informal apology.

COVID-19 recession
The COVID-19 pandemic significantly impacted all sectors of the Greek economy, and tourism in particular. As a result, GDP shrank by 9% in 2020, but rebounded by 8.3% in 2021. In June 2021, the European Commission agreed to disburse approximately 30 billion Euros in COVID-19 related economic aid (12 billion in loans and 18 billion in grants).

Data 
The following table shows the main economic indicators in 1980–2020 (with IMF staff estimates in 2021–2026). Inflation below 5% is in green.

Primary sector

Agriculture and fishery 

In 2010, Greece was the European Union's largest producer of cotton (183,800 tons) and pistachios (8,000 tons) and ranked second in the production of rice (229,500 tons) and olives (147,500 tons), third in the production of figs (11,000 tons) and almonds (44,000 tons), tomatoes (1,400,000 tons) and watermelons (578,400 tons) and fourth in the production of tobacco (22,000 tons). Agriculture contributes 3.8% of the country's GDP and employs 12.4% of the country's labor force.

Greece is a major beneficiary of the Common Agricultural Policy of the European Union. As a result of the country's entry to the European Community, much of its agricultural infrastructure has been upgraded and agricultural output increased. Between 2000 and 2007 organic farming in Greece increased by 885%, the highest change percentage in the EU.

In 2007, Greece accounted for 19% of the EU's fishing haul in the Mediterranean Sea, ranked third with 85,493 tons, and ranked first in the number of fishing vessels in the Mediterranean between European Union members. Additionally, the country ranked 11th in the EU in total quantity of fish caught, with 87,461 tons.

Secondary sector

Industry 

Between 2005 and 2011, Greece has had the highest percentage increase in industrial output compared to 2005 levels out of all European Union members, with an increase of 6%. Eurostat statistics show that the industrial sector was hit by the Greek financial crisis throughout 2009 and 2010, with domestic output decreasing by 5.8% and industrial production in general by 13.4%. Currently, Greece is ranked third in the European Union in the production of marble (over 920,000 tons), after Italy and Spain.

Between 1999 and 2008, the volume of retail trade in Greece increased by an average of 4.4% per year (a total increase of 44%), while it decreased by 11.3% in 2009. The only sector that did not see negative growth in 2009 was administration and services, with a marginal growth of 2.0%.

In 2009, Greece's labor productivity was 98% that of the EU average, but its productivity-per-hour-worked was 74% that the Eurozone average. The largest industrial employer in the country (in 2007) was the manufacturing industry (407,000 people), followed by the construction industry (305,000) and mining (14,000).

Greece has a significant shipbuilding and ship maintenance industry. The six shipyards around the port of Piraeus are among the largest in Europe. In recent years, Greece has become a leader in the construction and maintenance of luxury yachts.

Mining

Tertiary sector

Maritime industry 

Shipping has traditionally been a key sector in the Greek economy since ancient times. In 1813, the Greek merchant navy was made up of 615 ships. Its total tonnage was 153,580 tons and was manned with 37,526 crewmembers and 5,878 cannons. In 1914 the figures stood at 449,430 tons and 1,322 ships (of which 287 were steam boats).

During the 1960s, the size of the Greek fleet nearly doubled, primarily through the investment undertaken by the shipping magnates Onassis, Vardinoyannis, Livanos and Niarchos. The basis of the modern Greek maritime industry was formed after World War II when Greek shipping businessmen were able to amass surplus ships sold to them by the United States Government through the Ship Sales Act of the 1940s.

Greece has the largest merchant navy in the world, accounting for more than 15% of the world's total deadweight tonnage (dwt) according to the United Nations Conference on Trade and Development. The Greek merchant navy's total dwt of nearly 245 million is comparable only to Japan's, which is ranked second with almost 224 million. Additionally, Greece represents 39.52% of all of the European Union's dwt. However, today's fleet roster is smaller than an all-time high of 5,000 ships in the late 1970s.

Greece is ranked fourth in the world by number of ships (3,695), behind China (5,313), Japan (3,991), and Germany (3,833). A European Community Shipowners' Associations report for 2011–2012 reveals that the Greek flag is the seventh-most-used internationally for shipping, while it ranks second in the EU.

In terms of ship categories, Greek companies have 22.6% of the world's tankers and 16.1% of the world's bulk carriers (in dwt). An additional equivalent of 27.45% of the world's tanker dwt is on order, with another 12.7% of bulk carriers also on order. Shipping accounts for an estimated 6% of Greek GDP, employs about 160,000 people (4% of the workforce), and represents 1/3 of the country's trade deficit. Earnings from shipping amounted to €14.1 billion in 2011, while between 2000 and 2010 Greek shipping contributed a total of €140 billion (half of the country's public debt in 2009 and 3.5 times the receipts from the European Union in the period 2000–2013). The 2011 ECSA report showed that there are approximately 750 Greek shipping companies in operation.

The latest available data from the Union of Greek Shipowners show that "the Greek-owned ocean-going fleet consists of 3,428 ships, totaling 245 million deadweight tonnes in capacity. This equals 15.6 percent of the carrying capacity of the entire global fleet, including 23.6 percent of the world tanker fleet and 17.2 percent of dry bulk".

Counting shipping as quasi-exports and in terms of monetary value, Greece ranked 4th globally in 2011 having exported shipping services worth 17,704.132 million $; only Denmark, Germany and South Korea ranked higher during that year. Similarly counting shipping services provided to Greece by other countries as quasi-imports and the difference between exports and imports as a trade balance, Greece in 2011 ranked in the latter second behind Germany, having imported shipping services worth 7,076.605 million US$ and having run a trade surplus of 10,712.342 million US$.

Telecommunications 

Between 1949 and the 1980s, telephone communications in Greece were a state monopoly by the Hellenic Telecommunications Organization, better known by its acronym, OTE. Despite the liberalization of telephone communications in the country in the 1980s, OTE still dominates the Greek market in its field and has emerged as one of the largest telecommunications companies in Southeast Europe. Since 2011, the company's major shareholder is Deutsche Telekom with a 40% stake, while the Greek state continues to own 10% of the company's shares. OTE owns several subsidiaries across the Balkans, including Cosmote, Greece's top mobile telecommunications provider, Cosmote Romania and Albanian Mobile Communications.

Other mobile telecommunications companies active in Greece are Wind Hellas and Vodafone Greece. The total number of active cellular phone accounts in the country in 2009 based on statistics from the country's mobile phone providers was over 20 million, a penetration of 180%. Additionally, there are 5.745 million active landlines in the country.

Greece has tended to lag behind its European Union partners in terms of Internet use, with the gap closing rapidly in recent years. The percentage of households with Internet access more than doubled between 2006 and 2013, from 23% to 56% respectively (compared with an EU average of 49% and 79%). At the same time, there was a massive increase in the proportion of households with a broadband connection, from 4% in 2006 to 55% in 2013 (compared with an EU average of 30% and 76%). By 2022, the percentage of Greek households with Internet access had reached 85.5%.

Tourism 

Tourism in the modern sense only started to flourish in Greece in the years post-1950, although tourism in ancient times is also documented in relation to religious or sports festivals such as the Olympic Games. Since the 1950s, the tourism sector saw an unprecedented boost as arrivals went from 33,000 in 1950 to 11.4 million in 1994.

Greece attracts more than 16 million tourists each year, thus contributing 18.2% to the nation's GDP in 2008 according to an OECD report. The same survey showed that the average tourist expenditure while in Greece was $1,073, ranking Greece 10th in the world. The number of jobs directly or indirectly related to the tourism sector were 840,000 in 2008 and represented 19% of the country's total labor force. In 2009, Greece welcomed over 19.3 million tourists, a major increase from the 17.7 million tourists the country welcomed in 2008.

Among the member states of the European Union, Greece was the most popular destination for residents of Cyprus and Sweden in 2011.

The ministry responsible for tourism is the Ministry of Culture and Tourism, while Greece also owns the Greek National Tourism Organization which aims in promoting tourism in Greece.

In recent years a number of well-known tourism-related organizations have placed Greek destinations in the top of their lists. In 2009 Lonely Planet ranked Thessaloniki, the country's second-largest city, the world's fifth best "Ultimate Party Town", alongside cities such as Montreal and Dubai, while in 2011 the island of Santorini was voted as the best island in the world by Travel + Leisure. The neighbouring island of Mykonos was ranked as the 5th best island Europe. Thessaloniki was the European Youth Capital in 2014.

Trade and investment

Foreign investment 

Since the fall of communism, Greece has invested heavily in neighbouring Balkan countries. Between 1997 and 2009, 12.11% of foreign direct investment capital in North Macedonia was Greek, ranking fourth. In 2009 alone, Greeks invested €380 million in the country, with companies such as Hellenic Petroleum having made important strategic investments.

Greece invested €1.38 billion in Bulgaria between 2005 and 2007 and many important companies (including Bulgarian Postbank, United Bulgarian Bank Coca-Cola Bulgaria) are owned by Greek financial groups. In Serbia, 250 Greek companies are active with a total investment of over €2 billion. Romanian statistics from 2016 show that Greek investment in the country exceeded €4 billion, ranking Greece fifth or sixth among foreign investors. Greece has been the largest investor in Albania since the fall of communism with 25% of foreign investments in 2016 coming from Greece, in addition business relations between both are extremely strong and continuously rising.

Trade 

Since the start of the debt crisis, Greece's negative balance of trade has decreased significantly—from €44.3 billion in 2008 to €18.15 billion in 2020. In 2022, exports and imports rose by 36.8% and 42.2% respectively.

Greece is also the largest import partner of Cyprus (18.0%) and the largest export partner of Palau (82.4%).

Transport 

As of 2012, Greece had a total of 82 airports, of which 67 were paved and six had runways longer than 3,047 meters. Of these airports, two are classified as "international" by the Hellenic Civil Aviation Authority, but 15 offer international services. Additionally Greece has 9 heliports. Greece does not have a flag carrier, but the country's airline industry is dominated by Aegean Airlines and its subsidiary Olympic Air.

Between 1975 and 2009, Olympic Airways (known after 2003 as Olympic Airlines) was the country's state-owned flag carrier, but financial problems led to its privatization and relaunch as Olympic Air in 2009. Both Aegean Airlines and Olympic Air have won awards for their services; in 2009 and 2011, Aegean Airlines was awarded the "Best regional airline in Europe" award by Skytrax, and also has two gold and one silver awards by the ERA, while Olympic Air holds one silver ERA award for "Airline of the Year" as well as a "Condé Nast Traveller 2011 Readers Choice Awards: Top Domestic Airline" award.

The Greek road network is made up of 116,986 km of roads, of which 1863 km are highways, ranking 24th worldwide, as of 2016. Since the entry of Greece to the European Community (now the European Union), a number of important projects (such as the Egnatia Odos and the Attiki Odos) have been co-funded by the organization, helping to upgrade the country's road network. In 2007, Greece ranked 8th in the European Union in goods transported by road at almost 500 million tons.

Greece's rail network is estimated to be at 2,548 km. Rail transport in Greece is operated by TrainOSE, a current subsidiary of the Ferrovie dello Stato Italiane after the Hellenic Railways Organisation had sold its 100% stake on the operator. Most of the country's network is standard gauge (1,565 km), while the country also has 983 km of narrow gauge. A total of 764 km of rail are electrified. Greece has rail connections with Bulgaria, North Macedonia and Turkey. A total of three suburban railway systems (Proastiakos) are in operation (in Athens, Thessaloniki and Patras), while one metro system, the Athens Metro, is operational in Athens with another, the Thessaloniki Metro, under construction.

According to Eurostat, Greece's largest port by tons of goods transported in 2010 is the port of Aghioi Theodoroi, with 17.38 million tons. The Port of Thessaloniki comes second with 15.8 million tons, followed by the Port of Piraeus, with 13.2 million tons, and the port of Eleusis, with 12.37 million tons. The total number of goods transported through Greece in 2010 amounted to 124.38 million tons, a considerable drop from the 164.3 million tons transported through the country in 2007. Since then, Piraeus has grown to become the Mediterranean's third-largest port thanks to heavy investment by Chinese logistics giant COSCO. In 2013, Piraeus was declared the fastest-growing port in the world.

In 2010 Piraeus handled 513,319 TEUs, followed by Thessaloniki, which handled 273,282 TEUs. In the same year, 83.9 million people passed through Greece's ports, 12.7 million through the port of Paloukia in Salamis, another 12.7 through the port of Perama, 9.5 million through Piraeus and 2.7 million through Igoumenitsa. In 2013, Piraeus handled a record 3.16 million TEUs, the third-largest figure in the Mediterranean, of which 2.52 million were transported through Pier II, owned by COSCO and 644,000 were transported through Pier I, owned by the Greek state.

Energy 

Energy production in Greece is dominated by the Public Power Corporation (known mostly by its acronym ΔΕΗ, or in English DEI). In 2009 DEI supplied for 85.6% of all energy demand in Greece, while the number fell to 77.3% in 2010. Almost half (48%) of DEI's power output is generated using lignite, a drop from the 51.6% in 2009. Another 12% comes from Hydroelectric power plants and another 20% from natural gas. Between 2009 and 2010, independent companies' energy production increased by 56%, from 2,709 Gigawatt hour in 2009 to 4,232 GWh in 2010.

In 2008 renewable energy accounted for 8% of the country's total energy consumption, a rise from the 7.2% it accounted for in 2006, but still below the EU average of 10% in 2008. 10% of the country's renewable energy comes from solar power, while most comes from biomass and waste recycling. In line with the European Commission's Directive on Renewable Energy, Greece aims to get 18% of its energy from renewable sources by 2020. In 2013 and for several months, Greece produced more than 20% of its electricity from renewable energy sources and hydroelectric power plants. Greece currently does not have any nuclear power plants in operation, however in 2009 the Academy of Athens suggested that research in the possibility of Greek nuclear power plants begin.

Greece had 10 million barrels of proven oil reserves as of 1 January 2012. Hellenic Petroleum is the country's largest oil company, followed by Motor Oil Hellas. Greece's oil production stands at 1,751 barrels per day (bbl/d), ranked 95th worldwide, while it exports 19,960 bbl/d, ranked 53rd, and imports 355,600 bbl/d, ranked 25th.

In 2011 the Greek government approved the start of oil exploration and drilling in three locations within Greece, with an estimated output of 250 to 300 million barrels over the next 15 to 20 years. The estimated output in euros of the three deposits is €25 billion over a 15-year period, of which €13–€14 billion will enter state coffers. Greece's dispute with Turkey over the Aegean poses substantial obstacles to oil exploration in the Aegean Sea.

In addition to the above, Greece is also to start oil and gas exploration in other locations in the Ionian Sea, as well as the Libyan Sea, within the Greek exclusive economic zone, south of Crete. The Ministry of the Environment, Energy and Climate Change announced that there was interest from various countries (including Norway and the United States) in exploration, and the first results regarding the amount of oil and gas in these locations were expected in the summer of 2012. In November 2012, a report published by Deutsche Bank estimated the value of natural gas reserves south of Crete at €427 billion.

A number of oil and gas pipelines are currently under construction or under planning in the country. Such projects include the Interconnector Turkey-Greece-Italy (ITGI) and South Stream gas pipelines.

EuroAsia Interconnector will electrically connect Attica and Crete in Greece with Cyprus and Israel with 2000 MW HVDC undersea power cable. EuroAsia Interconnector is specially important for isolated systems, like Cyprus and Crete. Crete is energetically isolated from mainland Greece and Hellenic Republic covers for Crete electricity costs difference of around €300 million per year.

Taxation and tax evasion 

Greece has a tiered tax system based on progressive taxation. Greek law recognizes six categories of taxable income: immovable property, movable property (investment), income from agriculture, business, employment, and income from professional activities. Greece's personal income tax rate, until recently, ranged from 0% for annual incomes below €12,000 to 45% for annual incomes over €100,000. Under the new 2010 tax reform, tax exemptions have been abolished.

Also under the new austerity measures and among other changes, the personal income tax-free ceiling has been reduced to €5,000 per annum while further future changes, for example abolition of this ceiling, are already being planned.

Greece's corporate tax dropped from 40% in 2000 to 20% in 2010. For 2011 only, corporate tax will be at 24%. Value added tax (VAT) has gone up in 2010 compared to 2009: 23% as opposed to 19%.

The lowest VAT possible is 6.5% (previously 4.5%) for newspapers, periodicals and cultural event tickets, while a tax rate of 13% (from 9%) applies to certain service sector professions. Additionally, both employers and employees have to pay social contribution taxes, which apply at a rate of 16% for white collar jobs and 19.5% for blue collar jobs, and are used for social insurance. In 2017 the VAT tax rate was 24% with minor exceptions, 13% reduced for some basic foodstuffs which will be soon abolished and everything, as it seems, will soon go to 24% in order to fight the phantom of tax evasion.

The Ministry of Finance expected tax revenues for 2012 to be €52.7 billion (€23.6 billion in direct taxes and €29.1 billion in indirect taxes), an increase of 5.8% from 2011. In 2012, the government was expected to have considerably higher tax revenues than in 2011 on a number of sectors, primarily housing (an increase of 217.5% from 2011).

Tax evasion 

Greece suffers from very high levels of tax evasion. In the last quarter of 2005, tax evasion reached 49%, while in January 2006 it fell to 41.6%. It is worth noting that the newspaper Ethnos which published these figures went bankrupt; it is no longer published and some sources suggest that the information it had published was highly debatable. A study by researchers from the University of Chicago concluded that tax evasion in 2009 by self-employed professionals alone in Greece (accountants, dentists, lawyers, doctors, personal tutors and independent financial advisers) was €28 billion or 31% of the budget deficit that year.

Greece's "shadow economy" was estimated at 24.3% of GDP in 2012, compared with 28.6% for Estonia, 26.5% for Latvia, 21.6% for Italy, 17.1% for Belgium, 14.7% for Sweden, 13.7% for Finland, and 13.5% for Germany, and is certainly related to the fact that the percentage of Greeks that are self-employed is more than double the EU average (2013 est.).

The Tax Justice Network estimated in 2011 that there were over 20 billion euros in Swiss bank accounts held by Greeks. The former Finance Minister of Greece, Evangelos Venizelos, was quoted as saying, "Around 15,000 individuals and companies owe the taxman 37 billion euros". Additionally, the TJN put the number of Greek-owned off-shore companies at over 10,000.

In 2012, Swiss estimates suggested that Greeks had some 20 billion euros in Switzerland of which only one percent had been declared as taxable in Greece. Estimates in 2015 were even more dramatic. They indicated that the amount due to the government of Greece from Greeks' accounts in Swiss banks totaled around 80 billion euros.

A mid-2017 report indicated Greeks have been "taxed to the hilt" and many believed that the risk of penalties for tax evasion were less serious than the risk of bankruptcy. One method of evasion is the so-called black market, grey economy or shadow economy: work is done for cash payment which is not declared as income; as well, VAT is not collected and remitted. A January 2017 report by the DiaNEOsis think-tank indicated that unpaid taxes in Greece at the time totaled approximately 95 billion euros, up from 76 billion euros in 2015, much of it was expected to be uncollectable. Another early 2017 study estimated that the loss to the government as a result of tax evasion was between 6% and 9% of the country's GDP, or roughly between 11 billion and 16 billion euros per annum.

The shortfall in the collection of VAT (sales tax) is also significant. In 2014, the government collected 28% less than was owed to it; this shortfall was about double the average for the EU. The uncollected amount that year was about 4.9 billion euros. The DiaNEOsis study estimated that 3.5% of GDP is lost due to VAT fraud, while losses due to smuggling of alcohol, tobacco and petrol amounted to approximately another 0.5% of the country's GDP.

Planned solutions 
Following similar actions by the United Kingdom and Germany, the Greek government was in talks with Switzerland in 2011, attempting to force Swiss banks to reveal information on the back accounts of Greek citizens. The Ministry of Finance stated that Greeks with Swiss bank accounts would either be required to pay a tax or reveal information such as the identity of the bank account holder to the Greek internal revenue services. The Greek and Swiss governments were to reach a deal on the matter by the end of 2011.

The solution demanded by Greece still had not been effected as of 2015. That year, estimates indicated that the amount of evaded taxes stored in Swiss banks was around 80 billion euros. By then, however, a tax treaty to address this issue was under serious negotiation between the Greek and Swiss governments. An agreement was finally ratified by Switzerland on 1 March 2016 creating a new tax transparency law that would allow for a more effective battle against tax evasion. Starting in 2018, banks in both Greece and Switzerland will exchange information about the bank accounts of citizens of the other country to minimize the possibility of hiding untaxed income.

In 2016 and 2017, the government was encouraging the use of credit cards or debit cards to pay for goods and services in order to reduce cash only payments. By January 2017, taxpayers were only granted tax-allowances or deductions when payments were made electronically, with a "paper trail" of the transactions that the government could easily audit. This was expected to reduce the problem of businesses taking payments but not issuing an invoice; that tactic had been used by various companies to avoid payment of VAT (sales) tax as well as income tax.

By 28 July 2017, numerous businesses were required by law to install a point of sale device to enable them to accept payment by credit or debit card. Failure to comply with the electronic payment facility can lead to fines of up to 1,500 euros. The requirement applied to around 400,000 firms or individuals in 85 professions. The greater use of cards was one of the factors that had already achieved significant increases in VAT collection in 2016.

Wealth and standards of living

National and regional GDP 

Greece's most economically important regions are Attica, which contributed €87.378 billion to the economy in 2018, and Central Macedonia, which contributed €25.558 billion. The smallest regional economies were those of the North Aegean (€2.549 billion) and Ionian Islands (€3.257 billion).

In terms of GDP per capita, Attica (€23,300) far outranks any other Greek region. The poorest regions in 2018 were the North Aegean (€11,800), Eastern Macedonia and Thrace (€11,900) and Epirus (€12,200). At the national level, GDP per capita in 2018 was €17,200.

Welfare state 

Greece is a welfare state which provides a number of social services such as quasi-universal health care and pensions. In the 2012 budget, expenses for the welfare state (excluding education) stand at an estimated €22.487 billion (€6.577 billion for pensions and €15.910 billion for social security and health care expenses), or 31.9% of the all state expenses.

Largest companies by revenue 2018 

According to the 2018 Forbes Global 2000 index, Greece's largest publicly traded companies are:

Labour force

Working hours 
In 2011, 53.3 percent of employed persons worked more than 40 to 49 hours a week and 24.8 percent worked more than 50 hours a week, totaling up to 78.1 percent of employed persons working 40 or more hours a week. When accounting for varying age groups, the percentage of employees working 40 to 49 hours a week peaked in the 25 to 29 age range.  As workers got older, they gradually decreased in percentage working 40 to 49 hours, but increased in working 50+ hours, suggesting a correlation that as employees grow older, they work more hours. Of different occupation groups, skilled agricultural, forestry, and fishery workers and managers were the most likely to work 50+ hours; however, they do not take up a significant portion of the labor force, only 14.3 percent.  In 2014, the average number of working hours for Greek employees was 2124 hours, ranking as the third highest among OECD countries and the highest in the Eurozone.

Recent trends in employment indicate that the number of working hours will decrease in the future due to the rise of part-time work. Since 2011, average working hours have decreased. In 1998, Greece passed legislation introducing part-time employment in public services with the goal of reducing unemployment, increasing the total, but decreasing the average number of hours worked per employee. Whether the legislation was successful in increasing public-sector part-time work, labor market trends show that part-time employment has increased from 7.7 percent in 2007 to 11 percent in 2016 of total employment. Both men and women have had the part-time share of employment increase over this period. While women still constitute a majority of part-time workers, recently men have been taking a larger share of part-time employment.

Currency 
Between 1832 and 2002 the currency of Greece was the drachma. After signing the Maastricht Treaty, Greece applied to join the eurozone. The two main convergence criteria were a maximum budget deficit of 3% of GDP and a declining public debt if it stood above 60% of GDP. Greece met the criteria as shown in its 1999 annual public account. On 1 January 2001, Greece joined the eurozone, with the adoption of the euro at the fixed exchange rate ₯340.75 to €1. However, in 2001 the euro only existed electronically, so the physical exchange from drachma to euro only took place on 1 January 2002. This was followed by a ten-year period for eligible exchange of drachma to euro, which ended on 1 March 2012.

Prior to the adoption of the euro, 64% of Greek citizens viewed the new currency positively, but in February 2005 this figure fell to 26% and by June 2005 it fell further to 20%. Since 2010 the figure has risen again, and a survey in September 2011 showed that 63% of Greek citizens viewed of the euro positively.

Charts gallery

Poverty rate
As a result of the recession sparked by the public debt crisis, poverty has increased. The rate of people at risk of poverty or social exclusion reached a high of 36% in 2014, before subsiding over the following years to 28.9% in 2020. Those living in extreme poverty rose to 15% in 2015, up from 8.9% in 2011, and a huge increase from 2009 when it was not more than 2.2%. The rate among children 0-17 is 17.6% and for young people 18-29 the rate is 24.4%. With unemployment on the rise, those without jobs are at the highest risk of poverty (70–75%), up from less than 50% in 2011. Those out of work lose their health insurance after two years, further exacerbating the poverty rate. Younger unemployed people tend to rely on the older generations of their families for financial support. However, long-term unemployment has depleted pension funds due to fewer workers making social security contributions, resulting in higher poverty rates in intergenerational households reliant on the reduced pensions received by their retired members. Over the course of the economic crisis, Greeks have endured significant job losses and wage cuts, as well as deep cuts to workers' compensation and welfare benefits. From 2008 to 2013, Greeks became 40% poorer on average, and in 2014 saw their disposable household income drop below 2003 levels.

References

Further reading 
 
 Pasiouras, Fotios. Greek Banking: From the Pre-Euro Reforms to the Financial Crisis and Beyond (Palgrave Macmillan; 2012) 217 pages; covers the mid-1990s to 2011.

External links 

 Economy of Greece Ten Years After the Financial Crisis  – Macro Affairs
 Nick Malkoutzis Greece – A Year in Crisis – Friedrich-Ebert-Stiftung, June 2011
 The Greek Economy: Which Way Forward?, from the Center for Economic and Policy Research, January 2015
 The Greek Economy – a bi-monthly publication by the Hellenic Statistical Authority on the state of the economy
 The Greek Exports – Database of Greek Exporters
 Greek Banks Digest – (in English)
 World Bank Summary Trade Statistics Greece
 New study on the "Economic, Social and Territorial Situation of Greece" – European Parliament, Committee on Regional Development's delegation to Greece, 13 – 15 July 2011
 OECD data for Greece
 Federal Reserve Economic Data for Greece

 
Greece
Greece
Greece
World Trade Organization member economies